Sandfield may refer to:
 Max M. Sandfield (1903–1994), American architect
 Sandfield, Nova Scotia, Canada
 Sandfield, Ontario, Canada
 Sandfield Road, Headington, Oxford, England

See also 
 Sandfields (disambiguation)